Como Swings was Perry Como's fifth RCA Victor 12" long-play album, released in 1959. The album's concept was one of lively swing arrangements by Joe Lipman of standards from the Great American Songbook. The album was, in part, recorded to showcase the spectacular sound of RCA Victor's new Living Stereo recording process.

Track listing
Side one
"St. Louis Blues" (Words and music by W. C. Handy)
"I've Got You Under My Skin" (Words and music by Cole Porter)
"Route 66" (Words and music by Bobby Troup)
"Dear Hearts & Gentle People" (Music by Sammy Fain and lyrics by Bob Hilliard)
"Mood Indigo" (Words and music by Duke Ellington)
"Donkey Serenade" (Music by Rudolf Friml, Herbert Stothart, Robert Wright and George Forrest)

Side two
"To Know You" (Music by Robert Allen and lyrics by Allan Roberts)
"You Came A Long Way From St. Louis" (Music by John Benson Brooks and lyrics by Bob Russell)
"Honey, Honey ( Bless Your Heart)" (Music by Larry Stock and lyrics by Dominick Belline)
"Let a Smile Be Your Umbrella" (Music by Sammy Fain, Irving Kahal and Francis Wheeler)
"Linda"  (Words and music by Jack Lawrence)
"Begin the Beguine" (Words and music by Cole Porter)

References

External links
Perry Como Discography

Perry Como albums
1959 albums
RCA Victor albums
Albums produced by Charles Randolph Grean